KORE Wireless Group specializes in Internet of Things (IoT) systems. It is headquartered in Alpharetta, Georgia.

In March 2021, KORE and Cerberus Telecom Acquisition Corp. announced a definitive merger agreement. Upon completion of the transaction, the combined company, which has a pro forma valuation of $1.04 billion, expects to be listed on the New York Stock Exchange under the ticker symbol “KORE”.

History
KORE was founded in 2002 by Chris Scatliff by acquiring Zero Gravity Wireless, a Microcell reseller and support software developer. With Alex Brisbourne and William Greenberg as part of the founding team, KORE was repositioned as a provider of Machine-to-Machine connectivity.

Following the acquisition of Microcell by Rogers Wireless, KORE expanded its wholesale agreement to provide M2M and Mobile Virtual Network Operator (MVNO) footprint in Canada.

Wireless Matrix Corp selected KORE to provide the platform for fleet management across North America.

In 2010 Geotab selected KORE to enable it to expand its European fleet management products. KORE signed an agreement with both Vodafone and Iridium Communications to expand its MVNO M2M service to more than 180 countries in March 2011.

After launching M2M consulting company KORE Systems, the company then acquired all assets of nPhase from Verizon Wireless.

In May 2013, KORE became a founding member of the International M2M Council, with KORE's then COO Alex Brisbourne joining the Council's Board of Governors. In November 2013, Inmarsat appointed KORE as its M2M distribution partner,

In March 2014, KORE acquired Jazz Wireless Data to further enhance its service portfolio.

In November 2014, KORE announced that ABRY Partners would invest in KORE and simultaneously announced that KORE would acquire RacoWireless.

In April 2016, KORE acquired Wyless Group. Wyless Group, founded in 2003 by Christopher Lowery, a UK telecoms entrepreneur, had operating subsidiaries in UK, USA, Europe, Latin America and Asia.

In December 2018, KORE announced its acquisition of Aspider.

In December 2019, KORE announced its acquisition of Integron, an IoT solutions and managed services provider.

In February 2022, KORE acquired Business Mobility Partners and SIMON IoT.

Awards and recognition
2021: MarketWatch "KORE Named as a Leader in 2021 Magic Quadrant for Managed IoT Connectivity Services"
2021: PR Newswire "M2M Innovative Solution of the Year: KORE eSIM Device Validation Tool"
2020: Questex "KORE’s SecurityPro™ Named 2020 Security Technology Award Winner in the Fierce Innovation Awards"
2007: Network World "Top Nine Wireless Companies to Watch";
2008: Red Herring "100 North America".

References

Companies based in Fulton County, Georgia
Telecommunications companies established in 2003
Mobile technology companies
Information technology companies of the United States
Mobile virtual network operators
Mobile phone companies of the United States
Service-oriented architecture-related products
2003 establishments in Georgia (U.S. state)